The Levi L. Conant Prize is a mathematics prize of the American Mathematical Society, which has been awarded since 2000 for outstanding expository papers published in the Bulletin of the American Mathematical Society or the Notices of the American Mathematical Society in the past five years. The award is worth $1,000 and is awarded annually.

The award is named after Levi L. Conant (1857–1916), a professor at the Worcester Polytechnic Institute, known as the author of anthropological mathematics book "The number concept" (1896). He left the AMS $10,000 for the foundation of the award bearing his name.

Winners 
Source: American Mathematical Society
 2021: Dan Margalit for the article "The Mathematics of Joan Birman," Notices of the AMS, 66 (2019), 341-353
 2020: Amie Wilkinson for the article "What are Lyapunov exponents, and why are they interesting?",  Bulletin of the AMS, Volume 54,  January 2017, Pages 79–105
 2019: Alex Wright for  
 2018: Henry Cohn for  AMS Prize announcements
 2017: David H. Bailey, Jonathan Borwein, Andrew Mattingly and Glenn Wightwick for  
 2016: Daniel Rothman for 
 2015: Jeffrey Lagarias and Zong Chuanming for 
 2014: Alex Kontorovich for 
 2013: John C. Baez and John Huerta, for 
 2012: Persi Diaconis for 
 2011: David Vogan for 
 2010: Bryna Kra for 
 2009: John Morgan for 
 2007: Jeffrey Weeks for 
 2006: Ronald Solomon for 
 2005: Allen Knutson, Terence Tao for 
 2004: Noam Elkies for "Lattices, Linear Codes, and Invariants." Notices of the AMS, Vol. 47, 2000, Part 1: No. 10, pg. 1238–45; Part 2: No. 11, pg. 1382–91.
 2003: Nicholas Katz, Peter Sarnak for 
 2002: Elliott Lieb and Jakob Yngvason for 
 2001: Carl Pomerance for

See also

 List of mathematics awards

References 
The original article was a translation of the corresponding German article.

 The prize website

Awards of the American Mathematical Society